1 Chronicles 27 is the twenty-seventh chapter of the Books of Chronicles in the Hebrew Bible or the First Book of Chronicles in the Old Testament of the Christian Bible. The book is compiled from older sources by an unknown person or group, designated by modern scholars as "the Chronicler", and had the final shape established in late fifth or fourth century BCE. This chapter comprises five parts: David's military divisions and their commanders  (verses 1–15), the leaders of the tribes  (verses 16–22), a comment on the census (verses 23–24), David's civil officers (verses 25–31), and David's advisers (verses 32–34). The whole chapter belongs to the section focusing on the kingship of David (1 Chronicles 9:35 to 29:30), which from chapter 22 to the end does not have parallel in 2 Samuel.

Text
This chapter was originally written in the Hebrew language. It is divided into 34 verses.

Textual witnesses
Some early manuscripts containing the text of this chapter in Hebrew are of the Masoretic Text tradition, which includes the Aleppo Codex (10th century), and Codex Leningradensis (1008).

Extant manuscripts of a Koine Greek translation known as the Septuagint, made in the last few centuries BCE, include Codex Vaticanus (B; B; 4th century), Codex Alexandrinus (A; A; 5th century) and Codex Marchalianus (Q; Q; 6th century).

David's military divisions and their commanders (27:1–15)
The organization of the military was as orderly as that of the priests and Levites.  The military forces consisted of 12 divisions of 24,000 men, each subdivided into thousands and hundreds and headed by a divisional leader, reflecting David's standard administrative procedure (1 Chronicles 23:6-23; 24:1-19; 25:8-31; 26:1-12). Each division serves for one month a year, similar to Solomon's system of twelve royal officers in charge of one-month supplying the royal court (1 Kings 4:7).. The divisions' commanders are all mentioned in the list of David's heroes (11:10-47; 2 Samuel 23:8-39), though they are not the first twelve names stated and by contrast to chapter 11, the origins of names all come from the center of David's kingdom. The total army is enormous (288,000 men) and is only deployed as a militia in times of war. Some incongruities with ch. 11 as well as certain other details (such as two commanders of some
departments) suggest that this passage is based on real circumstances.

Verse 1
And the children of Israel, according to their number, the heads of fathers’ houses, the captains of thousands and hundreds and their officers, served the king in every matter of the military divisions. These divisions came in and went out month by month throughout all the months of the year, each division having twenty-four thousand.
"According to their number": from Hebrew:  lə-, here and in verses 23–24 (cf. 23:3) has the root noun "mispar" which means "number, tally" or can be rendered as "census" (rather than "list").

Leaders of the tribes (27:16–22)
The list following the army leaders is of the (political) leaders of the tribes. (cf. 1 Chronicles 5:6).  These leaders are presumed to be involved  in carrying out the census reported in verse 23. The twelve tribes are not listed according to a  consistent system in the Hebrew Bible, nor using the same names (some tribal chiefs can only be found in the Chronicles. It is most similar to Numbers 1 (which also involves a census), although not identical. The omission of Gad and Asher and the separation of the Aaronites from Levi are particularly notable in this list.

Comment on the census (27:23–24)

David's civil officers (27:25–31)
This section records detailed information on David's wealth, the geographical dispersal
of his agricultural estates (verse 27), as well as the storehouse in both urban and ruler areas (verses 27–28), and his highest-ranking administrative officers to oversee the trades (verse 30; camels and donkeys are not related directly to agriculture, but to trade). The list is regarded as a reliable historical document, that correctly reflects David's treasury; its historical authenticity is supported by several impressive arguments: the administration is simpler than during Solomon's reign and nothing contradicts the list's authenticity. The Bedouin (foreigners to the Israelites)  were employed in  David's administrators for their skill at keeping camels and smaller livestock. The extensive discussion of agriculture is typical in the Chronicles (as also observed in Uzziah's passion of agriculture in 2 Chronicles 26:10).

David's advisers (27:32–34)
This section lists David's closest officials, but not a parallel to the list of David's state
officials in 1 Chronicles 18:15-17. With historical information given as an aside, it seems not to be an official list.

Verse 33
And Ahithophel was the king's counsellor: and Hushai the Archite was the king's companion:

See also

Related Bible parts: Genesis 15, Genesis 22, Numbers 1, 2 Samuel 15, 2 Samuel 23,  1 Chronicles 11, 1 Chronicles 18, 1 Chronicles 23,  1 Chronicles 24, 1 Chronicles 25, 2 Chronicles 26

Notes

References

Sources

External links
 Jewish translations:
 Divrei Hayamim I - I Chronicles - Chapter 27 (Judaica Press) translation [with Rashi's commentary] at Chabad.org
 Christian translations:
 Online Bible at GospelHall.org (ESV, KJV, Darby, American Standard Version, Bible in Basic English)
 First Book of Chronicles Chapter 27. Bible Gateway

27